Rapala cassidyi, the Cassidy's flash is a lycaenid butterfly found in Sulawesi. It was discovered in 1985 during the Project Wallace expedition of the Royal Entomological Society. The female remains undescribed.

Range
The species lives in northern Sulawesi, Indonesia, in Bogani Nani Wartabone National Park.

Description
The upperside of the male is unusual in that it has only a small amount of pale orange on the discal area of the forewing below the cell; a pattern more reminiscent of females of the genus. The underside ground colour is light slate brown with a glossy sheen. The usual postdiscal striae or the genus are present in an ochreous colour and there is a diffuse ochreous marginal band on both wings.

Gallery

See also
Theclinae

Cited references

Rapala (butterfly)
Butterflies described in 1992